Arthur Robert Hurst (2 May 1923 – November 1993) was a Canadian ice hockey player who competed in the 1956 Winter Olympics.

Hurst was a member of the Kitchener-Waterloo Dutchmen who won the bronze medal for Canada in ice hockey at the 1956 Winter Olympics.

References

External links

1923 births
1993 deaths
Ice hockey players at the 1956 Winter Olympics
Medalists at the 1956 Winter Olympics
Olympic bronze medalists for Canada
Olympic ice hockey players of Canada